In 1915  John Browning patented a pump-action shotgun with the following features: hammerless, under-loading, tubular-magazine, bottom-ejecting, and take-down.  This design would eventually become the Remington Model 17.  Manufacturing rights were sold to Remington Arms shortly after, but due to the production efforts of World War I, Remington was unable to begin manufacturing until 1921.  Before production began John Pedersen made alterations to the design, with more changes made later by G. H. Garrison.  The Model 17 was a trim, 20-gauge shotgun that served as the design basis for three highly successful shotguns: the Remington Model 31, the Ithaca 37 and the Browning BPS. Additionally, features of the Model 17 were also incorporated in the later Mossberg 500 and Remington 870.

References

Remington Arms firearms
Pump-action shotguns